Jincheng Suzuki is a joint Sino-Japanese producer of motorcycles and scooters founded in 1994 and headquartered in Nanjing.  It is a joint venture between Suzuki and Nanjing Jincheng Machinery.  The company claims output of 3,000 units per month, making it the first-place exporter and foreign-currency earner in the Chinese motorcycle industry.

Notes

External links
Official page

Motorcycle manufacturers of China
Chinese companies established in 1994
Vehicle manufacturing companies established in 1994